Abrahão or Abraão is a Portuguese language surname and given name. It may be a variant of Abraham. The name is most prevalent in Brazil, and more common as a surname. The name may refer to:

People

Surname
Benjamin Abrahão Botto (1890–1938), Brazilian photographer
Filipe Abraão (1979–2019), Angolan basketball player
Miguel M. Abrahão (born 1961), Brazilian writer
Sophia Abrahão (born 1991), Brazilian singer and actress

Given name
Abrahão de Moraes (1916–1970), Brazilian astronomer and mathematician
Abraão José Bueno (born 1977), Brazilian serial killer
Abraão Lincoln Martins (born 1983), Brazilian football player
Abrahão Pio dos Santos Gourgel (born 1961), Angolan politician
Anísio Abraão David (born 1938), Brazilian illegal gambling operator

Places
Massamá e Monte Abraão, Portugal
Vila do Abraão, Brazil

References

Portuguese-language surnames